Oxylia duponcheli is a species of beetle in the family Cerambycidae. It was described by Brullé in 1833, originally under the genus Saperda. It is known from Greece, Bulgaria, Albania, and North Macedonia.

References

Saperdini
Beetles described in 1833